Qazi Faiz Muhammad  (b. 23 November 1908, d. 13 October 1982) was a progressive Pakistani politician and writer of Sindh, Pakistan. He led labour and peasant movements.

Early life 
According to autobiographical book Janab Guzariyam Jinseen by Sindhi Adabi Board Qazi was born to Qazi Nabi Bux Siddiqi on 23 November 1908 at Halani Town of District Nawab Shah, now Mehrabpur Taluka, Naushahro Feroze District , Sindh, Pakistan.

Career 
Since his childhood he joined politics and became member of Sindh Hari Committee under the leadership of Hyder Bux Jatoi. Qazi Faiz Muhammad supported "Quit India Movement" against Britain and opposed the Simon Commission. He was lawyer, secular politician, reformer, thinker, novelist and fond of classical Sufi music. He took actively part in Khilafat movement. He belonged to middle class family and was peasant leader. He was very close to Sheikh Mujibur Rahman. He was elected as secretary of Awami League party of Sheikh Mujibur Rahman in Sindh. He wrote letters to G.M Syed in 1946, 1949, 1957 and 1972 about the political situations in Sindh. His published novel Anjanu is countable contribution in Sindhi literature.

Death
Qazi Faiz Muhammad died on 13 October 1982.

References 

20th-century Pakistani politicians
Sindhi politicians
1908 births
1982 deaths